Jolly Tavoro Nyame (born 25 December 1955) in Zing Local Government Area of present-day Taraba State) was Governor of Taraba State in Nigeria from 29 May 1999 to 29 May 2007. He also served as governor of the state from January 1992 to November 1993. He is a member of the People's Democratic Party (PDP)

Early life
Nyame was born on (Dec 25, 1955) in Zing, Taraba state to Christian Parents. In line with his Christian faith, he took up a vocation in Priesthood and was Ordained a Reverend in the United Methodist Church of Nigeria.

Political life
Nyame joined politics in 1991, contested for Governor of Taraba state in 1992 and won. His term as governor in 1992 was short-lived due to the military takeover of power.
In 1999, Nyame contested as a governorship candidate of the Peoples Democratic Party and won. He was also re-elected in 2003, making him the only individual to have won three governorship elections in Taraba state.

Criminal charges
Upon leaving office in 2007, Nyame was charged by the Economic and Financial Crimes Commission (EFCC) for a fraud of 1.64 billion naira in a forty-one count charge of Fraud.
In 2007, Nyame admitted to misappropriating 180 million naira out of 250 million naira meant for stationaries in Taraba state and offered to return the same.

Conviction
On May 30, 2018, Nyame was convicted by the High court of the Federal Capital Territory, Abuja, under the ruling of Justice Adebukola Banjoko for the charges against him and was sentenced to 14 years in prison. He was asked to refund the monies he diverted.

In November 2018, The Court of Appeal in Abuja affirmed his conviction on 29 counts. The Appellate court however reviewed the sentences imposed by the trial court and sentenced him to 5 separate 12 year term of imprisonment which were to run concurrently instead of the initial 14 year Jail term and ordered him to pay a fine of 185 million naira. On 7 February 2020, the Supreme Court affirmed the 12 year jail term Judgment and set aside the fines imposed on him by the courts on the grounds that they were outrageous and done without any prompting.

Pardon
On April 14, the federal government of Nigeria granted Joshua Dariye and Jolly Nyame a presidential pardon. The action was criticised by civil society organisations and the general public.

Personal life 
Nyame is married to Priscilla J. T. Nyame.

See also
List of Governors of Taraba State

References

Living people
1955 births
Nigerian Methodists
Governors of Taraba State
Peoples Democratic Party state governors of Nigeria